California's 23rd State Senate district is one of 40 California State Senate districts. It is currently represented by Republican Rosilicie Ochoa Bogh.

District profile 
The district encompasses a wide arc of the Inland Empire, circling clockwise from Rancho Cucamonga in the northwest to Menifee in the south. It also includes several resort communities in the San Bernardino Mountains and a sliver of the High Desert.

Los Angeles County – <0.05% – northwest portion of Wrightwood (unincorporated) within Los Angeles County

Riverside County – 14.6%
 Banning
 Beaumont
 Calimesa
 Hemet
 Menifee
 San Jacinto

San Bernardino County – 30.2%
 Big Bear City
 Big Bear Lake
 Highland
 Loma Linda
 Phelan
 Rancho Cucamonga
 Redlands
 San Bernardino – 68.0%
 Yucaipa

Election results from statewide races

List of senators 
Due to redistricting, the 23rd district has been moved around different parts of the state. The current iteration resulted from the 2011 redistricting by the California Citizens Redistricting Commission.

Election results 1992 - present

2020

2016

2014 (special)

2012

2008

2004

2000

1996

1992

See also 
 California State Senate
 California State Senate districts
 Districts in California

References

External links 
 District map from the California Citizens Redistricting Commission

23
Government of San Bernardino County, California
State Senate 23
Banning, California
Beaumont, California
Cabazon, California
Calimesa, California
Hemet, California
Loma Linda, California
Menifee, California
Rancho Cucamonga, California
Redlands
San Bernardino, California
San Bernardino Mountains
San Bernardino National Forest
San Gabriel Mountains
San Jacinto Mountains
Wrightwood, California
Yucaipa, California